Murmansk Oblast is a federal subject (an oblast) of Russia, located in the northwestern part of the country. Its administrative center is the city of Murmansk. As of the 2010 Census, its population was 795,409.

Geography 

Geographically, Murmansk Oblast is located mainly on the Kola Peninsula almost completely north of the Arctic Circle and is a part of the larger Sápmi (Lapland) region that spans over four countries. The oblast borders with the Republic of Karelia in Russia in the south, Lapland Region in Finland in the west, Troms and Finnmark County in Norway in the northwest, and is bounded by the Barents Sea in the north and the White Sea in the south and east. Arkhangelsk Oblast of Russia lies across the White Sea.

The highest point of Murmansk Oblast is Yudychvumchorr, a flat-topped peak of the Khibiny. The north of the oblast is mostly covered by tundra; forest tundra prevails further south, while the southern regions are in the taiga zone. There are over 100,000 lakes and 18,000 rivers in the oblast. The coast contains the Rybachy Peninsula and the Cape Svyatoy Nos peninsulas.

The climate is harsh and unstable, due to the proximity of the Gulf Stream on one side and Arctic cold fronts on the other. Sharp temperature changes, high winds, and abundant precipitation are common throughout the year, with the heating season lasting for ten straight months. However, the waters of the Murman Coast in the south remain warm enough to remain ice-free even in winter.

There is also a large number of islands belonging to the oblast, the main ones being (west to east) the Aynovy Islands, Bolshoy Oleny Island, Kildin Island Malyy Oleniy Island, Kharlov Island, Vesknyak Island, Litskiye Island, Nokuyev Island, Vitte Island, Lumbovskiy Island, Goryainov Island and Sosnovets Island.

Lakes 
Lake Yurkhyamyayarvi

Climate 

Most areas of the Kola Peninsula are subarctic climate (Köppen climate classification: Dfc). The nearby islands usually belong to tundra (Köppen climate classification: ET).

History 

The Saami, now a very small minority, are the indigenous people of the region. Many Finns also immigrated to Murmansk during the Finnish famine, around the year 1860.

The oblast was established on May 28, 1938 from Murmansk Okrug of Leningrad Oblast (comprising the city of Murmansk, Kirovsky, Kolsky, Lovozersky, Polyarny, Saamsky, Teribersky, and Tersky Districts) and Kandalakshsky District of the Karelian ASSR.

The area of Pechengsky District (Petsamo in Finnish), which was ceded to Finland by the 1920 Treaty of Tartu and gave Finland access to the Barents Sea, was recaptured by the Soviet Union in 1940. After the Paris Peace Treaties of 1947, the local Saami population was given the choice either of staying in Soviet Russia or resettling in Finland. Most of them chose the second option. On 30 October 1997, Murmansk, alongside Astrakhan, Kirov, Ulyanovsk, and Yaroslavl signed a power-sharing agreement with the government of Russia, granting it autonomy. The agreement would be abolished on 31 May 2003.

Politics 

During the Soviet period, the high authority in the oblast was shared between three persons: The first secretary of the Murmansk CPSU Committee (who in reality had the biggest authority), the chairman of the oblast Soviet (legislative power), and the Chairman of the oblast Executive Committee (executive power). Since 1991, CPSU lost all the power, and the head of the Oblast administration, and eventually the governor was appointed/elected alongside elected regional parliament.

The Charter of Murmansk Oblast is the fundamental law of the region. The Legislative Assembly of Murmansk Oblast is the province's standing legislative (representative) body. The Legislative Assembly exercises its authority by passing laws, resolutions, and other legal acts and by supervising the implementation and observance of the laws and other legal acts passed by it. The highest executive body is the Oblast Government, which includes territorial executive bodies such as district administrations, committees, and commissions that facilitate development and run the day to day matters of the province. The Oblast administration supports the activities of the Governor who is the highest official and acts as guarantor of the observance of the oblast Charter in accordance with the Constitution of Russia.

Governors of Murmansk Oblast

Chairmen of the Murmansk Oblast Duma 

Source:

Administrative divisions

Demographics 
Population: 

The indigenous people of the area, the Saami, are only a tiny minority today. As of the 2002 Census, 92.2% of the oblast's population live in urban areas. The most populous city is the Oblast's administrative center, Murmansk, with 336,137 inhabitants.  Other large cities and towns include Severomorsk, Apatity, Kandalaksha, Monchegorsk, and Kirovsk.

According to the 2010 Census, the ethnic composition of the oblast was as follows:
 Russians: 89%
 Ukrainians: 4.8%
 Belarusians: 1.7%
 Tatars: 0.8%
 Azeris: 0.5%
 Mordvins: 0.2%
 Karelians: 0.2%
 Komi: 0.2%
 Saami: 0.2%
 others: 2.4%
 73,484 people were registered from administrative databases, and could not declare an ethnicity. It is estimated that the proportion of ethnicities in this group is the same as that of the declared group.

 Birth rate: 11.7 per 1000 (average for Russia is 13.30)
 Death rate: 11.2 per 1000
 Total fertility rate:

In 2009, the urban areas were marked by natural population decline (−0.16% per year) and the rural areas were marked by natural population growth (+0.35% per year).

Religion 

According to a 2012 survey 41.7% of the population of Murmansk Oblast adheres to the Russian Orthodox Church, 3% are unaffiliated generic Christians, 1% are Orthodox Christian believers who do not belong to any church or are members of other (non-Russian) Orthodox churches, 1% are adherents of Islam, 0.4% are adherents of Rodnovery (Slavic native faith) and other indigenous folk religions, and 1% are members of the Catholic Church. In addition, 28% of the population declares to be "spiritual but not religious", 12% is atheist, and 12.5% follows other religions or did not give an answer to the question.

Economy 
The Murmansk Oblast is very rich in natural resources and has deposits of over 700 minerals. The main industries of the region are in the sphere of raw material extraction and basic processing. The largest industries are metallurgy (36,6%), electric power-production (22,9%) and food-industry, including fishing (13,7%). The icefree port of Murmansk plays an important role in marine transportation in Russia, and the oblast has a 41% share of the total Russian marine transport market. The fishing industry is among the most profitable in the region, supplying 16% of Russia's total fish production. Murmansk is a key base for three fishing fleets, including Russia's largest, the Murmansk Trawl Fleet.

The economy of the region is export-oriented. Main export items are nickel products, apatite concentrate, copper and copper products, aluminium and ferrous metals. The Murmansk Region produces almost 100 percent of Russia's apatite concentrate (3.7 million tons in 1998), 43 percent of nickel, 15 percent of copper, 12 percent of iron ore and iron ore concentrate (17.7 million and 6.4 million tons in 1998), and 40 percent of cobalt.

The largest companies of the region – constituting 90% of the oblast's production – are Pechenganickel, Olcon, the Kola Nuclear Power Plant, Sevrybkholodflot, Murmanrybprom, Murmansk Trawl Fleet and Murmansk Shipping Company.

Large oil and gas resources have been discovered on the shelf of the Barents sea, including the massive Shtokman field – one of the world's largest gas fields with estimated reserves of 3.8 trillion cubic meters. Prospective oil fields could potentially yield up to 40 million tons in the next 10–15 years. However, the development of the oil and gas resources will require considerable investment.

In 2006, the Murmansk Oblast's gross regional product was 141.9 billion rubles, which amounts to about 0.4% of the Russian GDP. Unemployment in 2006 was 3,4%. GRP pro capita in 2007 was 225 044 rubles. Regional automobile code is 51.

Transportation 
 Airports in Murmansk (international), Kirovsk, Kandalaksha, Severomorsk (military), Lovozero (military), Ponoy, and Krasnoshchelye (small planes and choppers).
 Strategic Oktyabrskaya Railway which connects Murmansk with Saint-Petersburg and central Russia. Main stations are Murmansk, Olenegorsk, Kandalaksha. There is also important shoulder to Nikel, the Murmansk-Nikel Railway.
 Local one-way railways
 Sea routes to small military towns and naval bases on Murman Coast (Ostrovnoy, Svyatoy Nos).
 Automobile roads

Military 
The Murmansk Oblast plays an important role for the Russian Navy, the Northern Fleet having its headquarters in Severomorsk, 25 km north of Murmansk. The Navy has several other bases and shipyards in the Murmansk Oblast.

The 200th Separate Motor Rifle Brigade is stationed at Pechenga.

See also 
 Barents Region
 Lake Chudzyavr
 Lake Kildinskoye

References

Notes

Sources 
 
 
 
 
 Wm. O. Field, Jr. The Kola Peninsula. Gibraltar of the Western Arctic. The American Quarterly on the Soviet Union. July 1938. Vol. I, No. 2.

External links 

 Official website of Murmansk Oblast  
Directory of organizations in Murmansk 

 
States and territories established in 1938
Fennoscandia
1938 establishments in Russia